Lopharcha moriutii is a species of moth of the family Tortricidae. It is found in Thailand and China (Hong Kong).

References

External links

Moths described in 2006
Moths of Asia
moriutii